Marsh & Saxelbye was a Florida architectural firm that designed numerous notable buildings in Florida.  More than 20 of their works are preserved and listed on the National Register of Historic Places for their architecture.

Notable works

Other works credited to the firm or to Harold F. Saxelbye include:
First Church of Christ, Scientist (Jacksonville, Florida)
San Jose Episcopal Church
Buckman and Ulmer Building, 29–33 W. Monroe St. 	Jacksonville 	FL (Marsh & Saxelbye) NRHP-listed
Casa Marina Hotel, 12 Sixth Ave., N. 	Jacksonville Beach 	FL (Marsh and Saxelbye) NRHP-listed
House at 3325 Via de la Reina, 3325 Via de la Reiva 	Jacksonville 	FL (Marsh & Saxelbye) NRHP-listed
House at 3335 Via de la Reina, 3335 Via de la Reina 	Jacksonville 	FL (Marsh & Saxelbye) NRHP-listed
House at 3500 Via de la Reina, 3500 Via de la Reina 	Jacksonville 	FL (Marsh & Saxelbye) NRHP-listed
House at 3609 Via de la Reina, 3609 Via de la Reina 	Jacksonville 	FL (Marsh & Saxelbye) NRHP-listed
House at 3685 Via de la Reina, 3685 Via de la Reina 	Jacksonville 	FL (Marsh & Saxelbye) NRHP-listed
House at 3703 Via de la Reina, 3703 Via de la Reina 	Jacksonville 	FL (Marsh & Saxelbye) NRHP-listed
House at 3764 Ponce de Leon Avenue, 3764 Ponce de Leon Ave. 	Jacksonville 	FL (Marsh & Saxelbye) NRHP-listed
House at 7144 Madrid Avenue, 7144 Madrid Ave. 	Jacksonville 	FL (Marsh & Saxelbye) NRHP-listed
House at 7207 Ventura Avenue, 7207 Ventura Ave. 	Jacksonville 	FL (Marsh & Saxelbye) NRHP-listed
House at 7217 Ventura Avenue, 7217 Ventura Ave. 	Jacksonville 	FL (Marsh & Saxelbye) NRHP-listed
House at 7227 San Pedro, 7227 San Pedro Rd. 	Jacksonville 	FL (Marsh & Saxelbye) NRHP-listed
House at 7245 San Jose Boulevard, 7245 San Jose Blvd. 	Jacksonville 	FL (Marsh & Saxelbye) NRHP-listed
House at 7246 San Carlos, 7246 San Carlos 	Jacksonville 	FL (Marsh & Saxelbye) NRHP-listed
House at 7246 St. Augustine Road, 7246 St. Augustine Rd. 	Jacksonville 	FL (Marsh & Saxelbye) NRHP-listed
House at 7249 San Pedro, 7249 San Pedro Rd. 	Jacksonville 	FL (Marsh & Saxelbye) NRHP-listed
House at 7288 San Jose Boulevard, 7288 San Jose Blvd. 	Jacksonville 	FL (Marsh & Saxelbye) NRHP-listed
House at 7306 St. Augustine Road, 7306 St. Augustine Rd. 	Jacksonville 	FL (Marsh & Saxelbye) NRHP-listed
House at 7317 San Jose Boulevard, 7317 San Jose Blvd. 	Jacksonville 	FL (Marsh & Saxelbye) NRHP-listed
House at 7330 Ventura Avenue, 7330 Ventura Ave. 	Jacksonville 	FL (Marsh & Saxelbye) NRHP-listed
House at 7400 San Jose Boulevard, 7400 San Jose Blvd., Jacksonville, FL (Marsh & Saxelbye) NRHP-listed
Lane-Towers House, 3730 Richmond St. 	Jacksonville 	FL (Saxelbe, Harold) NRHP-listed
San Jose Administration Building, 7423 San Jose Blvd. 	Jacksonville 	FL) NRHP-listed
San Jose Country Club, 7529 San Jose Blvd. 	Jacksonville 	FL) NRHP-listed
San Jose Estates Gatehouse, 1873 Christopher Point Rd., North 	Jacksonville 	FL) NRHP-listed
San Jose Hotel, 7400 San Jose Boulevard 	Jacksonville 	FL) NRHP-listed
South Atlantic Investment Corporation Building, 35–39 W. Monroe St. 	Jacksonville 	FL) NRHP-listed
Stockton, Whatley & Davin Building, Life of the South,  100 West Bay St.  Jacksonville
Village Store, 4216, 4212, 4208 Oxford Ave., 2906 and 2902 Corinthian Ave. 	Jacksonville 	FL, (Saxelbye, Harold F.) NRHP-listed
Wakulla Springs Archeological and Historic District, 1 Spring Dr. 	Wakulla Springs 	FL, (Marsh & Saxelbye) NRHP-listed

See also
Architecture of Jacksonville

References

Architecture firms based in Florida
Lists of buildings and structures in Florida
Architecture firms based in Jacksonville